The 6th Asian Table Tennis Championships 1982 were held in Jakarta, Indonesia, from 24 May to 3 June 1982. It was organised by the Indonesian Table Tennis Association under the authority of Asian Table Tennis Union (ATTU) and International Table Tennis Federation (ITTF).

Medal summary

Medal table

Events

See also
World Table Tennis Championships
Asian Cup

References

Asian Table Tennis Championships
Asian Table Tennis Championships
Table Tennis Championships
Table tennis competitions in Indonesia
Asian Table Tennis Championships
Asian Table Tennis Championships
Asian Table Tennis Championships